Nathaniel Joseph Livings (born March 16, 1982) is a former American football guard in the National Football League (NFL) for the Cincinnati Bengals and the Dallas Cowboys. He played college football at Louisiana State University.

Early years
Livings attended Washington-Marion Magnet High School where he played defensive tackle. As a senior, he was named All-Southwest Louisiana after registering 124 tackles and 5 sacks.

He had academic eligibility problems and instead of going to a junior college, chose to sit out two full years taking correspondence courses. He received a scholarship from Louisiana State University, where he was a three-year starter and played every offensive line position except center. He appeared in 38 games (34 starts) and was a part of the 2003 championship team.

Professional career

Cincinnati Bengals
Livings was signed by the Cincinnati Bengals as an undrafted free agent on May 2, 2006. He spent two seasons in the team's practice squad, until November 17, 2008, when he was promoted for depth purposes. He became a starter at left guard in the eleventh game of the season, and remained a starter in the following years.

Dallas Cowboys
Livings signed as a free agent with the Dallas Cowboys on March 16, 2012, with the intention of replacing Kyle Kosier. Although he started every game, his play didn't live up to expectations. On September 1, 2013, he was placed on the injured reserve list after missing most of the pre-season with a right knee injury, the same problem that bothered him for much of the previous year. He was released on September 5.

References

External links
Livings Overcame Early Setbacks with Faith, Focus
Bengals bio
LSU Tigers bio

1982 births
Living people
Sportspeople from Lake Charles, Louisiana
Players of American football from Louisiana
American football offensive guards
American football offensive tackles
LSU Tigers football players
Cincinnati Bengals players
Dallas Cowboys players